The Four Musketeers (also known as The Four Musketeers (The Revenge of Milady)) is a 1974 British swashbuckler film that serves as a sequel to the 1973 film The Three Musketeers, and covers the second half of Dumas' 1844 novel The Three Musketeers.

Fifteen years after completion of The Four Musketeers, much of the cast and crew reassembled to film The Return of the Musketeers (1989), loosely based on Dumas' Twenty Years After (1845).

Plot
During the Anglo-French War (1627–29), which involved suppression of the Protestant rebels of La Rochelle, Cardinal Richelieu continues the machinations he began in The Three Musketeers by ordering the Count de Rochefort to kidnap Constance Bonacieux, dressmaker to Queen Anne of France. The evil Milady de Winter, who wants revenge on junior musketeer d'Artagnan, seduces him to keep him occupied. He soon discovers her true nature, however, and also that she was once married to his fellow musketeer Athos, who had supposedly killed her after discovering that she was a branded criminal.

The trio of musketeers — Athos, Porthos, and Aramis — rescue Constance from imprisonment in Rochefort's abode of Saint Cloud and take her to safety in the convent of Armentières. De Winter sends d'Artagnan poisoned wine and a note intended to trick him into thinking that the trio have been imprisoned for drunkenness. On his way to bail them out, d'Artagnan is attacked by Rochefort and his men. The trio join the fight, and Rochefort flees. One of his men is captured and tortured for information, revealing that Richelieu is going to the Dovecote Inn near La Rochelle, but then drinks the poisoned wine and dies, revealing de Winter's trap. The trio then proceed to the inn where they spy on Richelieu. The Cardinal orders de Winter to threaten the Duke of Buckingham with exposure of his affair with the Queen, to discourage him from sending a relief force to aid the rebels; she is to kill the Duke if he does not comply. In return, de Winter asks for a warrant, so she can kill d'Artagnan and Constance. Richelieu reluctantly signs one, wording it in a way that leaves no evidence against himself: "By my order and for the good of the state, the bearer has done what has been done."

After revealing himself to de Winter, Athos takes the death warrant from her and later tells d'Artagnan of the plot. D'Artagnan sends his servant Planchet to warn the Duke. In England, de Winter asks Buckingham not to help the rebels, but he refuses. De Winter tries to assassinate him, but she is captured. Buckingham has his servant John Felton lock her away in the Tower of London, but she seduces Felton and convinces him that Buckingham is his enemy. Felton helps her to escape and return to France, then murders Buckingham before Planchet can warn him. Soon after, La Rochelle surrenders.

Rochefort and de Winter are still intent on killing d'Artagnan and Constance. With a force of guards, they occupy the convent at Armentières and battle all four musketeers when they arrive. While Rochefort and his men hold the musketeers at bay, de Winter strangles Constance. Athos captures de Winter; D'Artagnan duels Rochefort and apparently kills him with a lunge through the chest (though it is revealed in the sequel The Return of the Musketeers that he actually survived the wound). The four musketeers sentence de Winter to death by beheading, and they hire an executioner to carry out the punishment. Afterward, they are arrested by the Cardinal's guards.

Richelieu charges d'Artagnan with murder for killing a valuable servant of the State, but d'Artagnan shows him the signed death warrant which, due to its ambiguous phrasing, appears to authorize d'Artagnan's actions. Defeated and quite impressed at d'Artagnan's achievement, the Cardinal offers him a commission for either him or one of his three friends to become an officer. Athos, Porthos, and Aramis all reject it, and d'Artagnan is promoted to Lieutenant of the Musketeers.

Cast
 Michael York as d'Artagnan
 Oliver Reed as Athos
 Frank Finlay as Porthos
 Richard Chamberlain as Aramis
 Jean-Pierre Cassel as  Louis XIII
 Geraldine Chaplin as Anne of Austria
 Charlton Heston as Cardinal Richelieu
 Faye Dunaway as Milady de Winter
 Christopher Lee as the Count De Rochefort
 Raquel Welch as Constance Bonacieux
 Roy Kinnear as Planchet
 Michael Gothard as Felton
 Sybil Danning as Eugenie 
 Nicole Calfan as Kitty

Production
During production on The Three Musketeers, the producers realized that the project was so lengthy that they would not be able to complete it as initially intended — as a roadshow epic with intermission — and still achieve their announced release date. The decision was therefore made to split the project into two films, and thus the two halves were released as The Three Musketeers and The Four Musketeers some six months apart. Most of the actors were incensed that their work on the long shoot was used to make an entirely separate film, while they were only being paid for the work of one.  Lawsuits were filed on behalf of those contributing to the film  to gain the salaries and benefits associated with a second film that was not mentioned in the original contracts. All SAG actors' contracts now have what is known as the "Salkind clause", which stipulates how many films are being made.

Reception and awards
The film received mostly positive reviews.

It was also nominated at the 48th Academy Awards for Best Costumes (Yvonne Blake and Ron Talsky).

References

External links
 
 
 
 
 

1974 films
1970s historical adventure films
British historical adventure films
British swashbuckler films
Films based on The Three Musketeers
Films directed by Richard Lester
Films shot in Madrid
Films scored by Lalo Schifrin
Films set in France
Films set in Paris
Films set in La Rochelle
Films set in London
Films set in Hampshire
Films with screenplays by George MacDonald Fraser
Cultural depictions of Cardinal Richelieu
Cultural depictions of Louis XIII
Films shot in Almería
Films shot at Twickenham Film Studios
Films produced by Pierre Spengler
1970s English-language films
1970s British films